Sadlier  is a surname. Notable people with the surname include:

Anna T. Sadlier (1854-1932), Canadian writer, translator 
Clifford Sadlier (1892–1964), Australian Victoria Cross recipient
Kieran Sadlier (born 1994), Irish footballer
Mary Anne Sadlier (1820–1903), Irish writer
Richard Sadlier (born 1979), Irish footballer
Tom Sadlier (1890–1960), Australian rules footballer
William Sadlier (bishop) (1867–1935), New Zealand Anglican bishop

See also
Sadlier baronets, a title in the Baronetage of England
William H. Sadlier, an American publishing company
Sadliers
Sadleir (disambiguation)